Earth and Ashes is a 2004 Afghan film directed by Atiq Rahimi. It was Afghanistan's submission to the 77th Academy Awards for the Academy Award for Best Foreign Language Film but was not nominated. It was also screened in the Un Certain Regard section at the 2004 Cannes Film Festival. It won the Golden Dhow award at the 2005 Zanzibar International Film Festival.

Cast
 Abdul Ghani - Dastaguir
 Jawan Mard Homayoun - Yassin
 Kader Arefi - Fateh
 Guilda Chahverdi - Zaynab
 Walli Tallosh - Mirza Qadir
 Malik Akhlaqi - Malik khan

See also
List of submissions to the 77th Academy Awards for Best Foreign Language Film
16 Days in Afghanistan

References

External links

2004 films
Dari-language films
Films directed by Atiq Rahimi
Films shot in Afghanistan
2004 drama films
Afghan drama films